Maschalodesme is a genus of flowering plants belonging to the family Rubiaceae.

Its native range is New Guinea.

Species:

Maschalodesme arborea 
Maschalodesme versteegii

References

Rubiaceae
Rubiaceae genera